Phosphoinositide 3-kinase regulatory subunit 5 is an enzyme that in humans is encoded by the PIK3R5 gene.

Interactions
PIK3R5 has been shown to interact with PIK3CG.

References

Further reading